Lake Walker National Park is a proposed national park in the province of Quebec, Canada, centered on the  long  Lake Walker.

Location

The proposed park is in a region of taiga in the center of the Port-Cartier–Sept-Îles Wildlife Reserve.

Environment

The region has high hills cut by deep glacial valleys running between rocky escarpments.
There are many streams and lakes of all sizes in the territory, including the Schmon, Gravel, Pasteur and MacDonald rivers, which meander through wide glacial valleys.
Other attractions of the park would be the Lake Larry Old Growth Forest and the MacDonald and Cody Falls.

Process

The Sept-Rivières Regional County Municipality and the economic corporation of that city began working on the concept of creating a national park within Sépaq's Réserve faunique  Port-Cartier/Sept-Îles in 2006.
The project would involve addition of campsites, cottages and other tourist facilities.

The Department of Biodiversity Expertise of Quebec's Ministry of Sustainable Development, Environment, and Fight Against Climate Change (MDDELCC) produced a report in July 2018 to support the National Parks Directorate (NDP) of the Ministry of Forests, Wildlife and Parks (MFFP) in preparing their report on the park.
The MDDELCC report describes the main geological and geomorphological features of the territory, areas of geomorphological interest for study and education, and the typical natural characteristics of the region.
In 2018 the Ministry of Forests, Wildlife and Parks submitted a descriptive study.

As of May 2019 the project had not been funded, and was waiting on a decision by Pierre Dufour, the Minister of Forests, Wildlife and Parks.

Waterbodies

A map of the proposed park shows the MacDonald River and Aux Rochers River along its western and southern border, the Ronald River in the southwest, the Schmon River, Gravel River and Little Gravel River flowing through the park from the north, and the Pasteur and Aux Foins rivers leaving the park from the south to join the Aux Rochers River.

Apart from Lake Walker, lakes include Lake Quatre Lieues in the extreme south, Lake Jumbo, Lake Larry and Lake Cody in the southwest, Lake David, Lake Chisholm, Lake Ovide, Lake Saint Joseph and Lake Provencher in the northwest, Lake Goéland, Lake Gagné, Lake Chassé and Lake Lelièvre in the north east, and Lake Atanache, Lake Pineault, Lake Chevarie , Lake Truite, Lake Arsenault, Lake Carter, Lake Carré, Lake Pasteur, Little Anguille Lake and Lake Morin in the southeast.

Notes

Sources

External links

National parks of Quebec